Underground Symphony is an Italian record label specialised in metal productions.
It is best known for having launched artists such as Labyrinth, Skylark, White Skull, Fabio Lione and Olaf Thorsen.

Catalog
<div style="font-size:98%; border:1px; padding:1px; text-align:center">

Record labels established in 1994
Italian record labels
Heavy metal record labels